Brachyplatys punctipes is a species of shield bugs belonging to the family Plataspidae
found in China.

References

External links
 Image at Pbase

Shield bugs
Insects of China